The U-Tsang Military Commission (Chinese: 乌斯藏都指挥使司) was a title in Ü-Tsang’s Jimi system established in 1372, during the Ming dynasty. It was matched in eastern Tibet by the Do-kham Regional Military Commission. Both were subordinate to the Shaanxi Regional Military Commission; or in western Tibet to the Ngari Commanding Tribal Office. Both were deactivated after Rinpungpa. Some Chinese scholars claim that their existence proves Tibet's suzerainty to China during this period; others that they were nominal agencies, as the reins of government are still under Tibetan aristocrats and monks.

References

Government of the Ming dynasty
14th-century establishments in Tibet
China–Tibet relations
1372 establishments in Asia
1446 disestablishments
Military history of the Ming dynasty